Kannur Beach is a group of five beaches on the western side of Kannur city in Kerala, India.  
They are 
  Payyambalam Beach
 Meenkunnu Beach
 Adikadalayi Beach
 Baby Beach
 Thayyil Beach

Overview
A sculpture Amma ( Thai) by Kanayi Kunhiraman is an attractive feature of the beach garden.  A part of the garden is specially for children. Many movies have been shot in this location including the Maniratnam movie Alaipayuthey. The Worldspace ad featuring A.R. Rahman was also shot here.

Graves of Important People
Kannur beach is popular for the graves of some of the most prominent social leaders of Kerala. Leadaers like E. K. Nayanar, Swadeshabhimani Ramakrishna Pillai, A. K. Gopalan, Pamban Madhavan, Sukumar Azhikode and K. G. Marar are laid to rest near this beach.

Muzhappilangad Drive-in Beach
Muzhappilangad Beach is popular for driving because of its hard surface. There is continuous stretch of five kilometers suitable for driving cars and motorbikes.  The beach is located on the national highway to Thalassery.  This is the longest drive-in beach in India.

Thottada Beach
Thottada Beach is a beautiful beach some 2 km south of Kannur.  This beach is 800 meters long and many tourists come here for sunbathing.  The Thottada river flows into the beach.

Meenkunnu Beach
Meenkunnu Beach is on the road to Azhikode.  This beach is popular among Europeans because of its picture-postcard-looks.  There are no facilities on the beach for tourists.  It is the favorite of the click happy tourist.

St.Angelo's Fort
Kannur Fort or St.Angelo's Fort is about three km south of Kannur city.  This fort was built in 1505 by the Portuguese.  The Dutch captured the fort in 1663 and modernized it.  In 2015, thousands of abandoned cannonballs were discovered from the fort during an excavation.

The Mappila Bay
The Mappila Bay Harbour and the Arakkal Museum are near the city.  There are many beautiful mosques in this area.

See also
 Kannur
 Meenkunnu Beach
 Muzhappilangad Beach
 Dharmadam Island
 Thottada Beach
 St. Angelo Fort

References

Gallery

External links

Beaches of Kerala
Geography of Kannur district